Paulhew "Paul" Cohen (born January 31, 1965) is a Canadian former professional ice hockey goaltender.

Early life 
Cohen was born in Toronto. Prior to turning professional, Cohen attended St. Lawrence University, where he played four seasons of NCAA Division-I hockey with the St. Lawrence Saints men's ice hockey team.

Career 
On March 28, 1992, when playing for the Springfield Indians, Cohen sent a rink-length shot into a Rochester empty net to become only the second goaltender in the American Hockey League's 55-year history to score a goal. The first AHL goaltender to score a goal was Darcy Wakaluk.

On January 14, 1993, the Sunshine Hockey League announced that they had suspended Cohen, then playing with the West Palm Beach Blaze, for the remainder of the season for delivering an illegal cross-check during a game that sent a player to the hospital with a concussion.

Awards and honors

References

External links

1965 births
Living people
Canadian ice hockey goaltenders
Capital District Islanders players
Jewish Canadian sportspeople
Jewish ice hockey players
Kansas City Blades players
Nashville Knights players
Richmond Renegades players
Roanoke Express players
Springfield Indians players
St. Lawrence Saints men's ice hockey players
Toledo Storm players
Winston-Salem Thunderbirds players
Florida Hammerheads players